Heron Daniele Campbell (born 23 December 1987) is a Grenadian cricketer who has played for the Windward Islands in West Indian domestic cricket. He is a right-handed opening batsman.

Campbell played for Grenada at the 2006 and 2008 editions of the Stanford 20/20, making his debut at the age of 18. He made his first-class debut for the Windwards in the 2006–07 Carib Beer Cup, against Guyana. Campbell's highest score for the Windwards came against the Leeward Islands in the 2007–08 Carib Beer Cup, an innings of 48 runs opening the batting with Miles Bascombe. He has not played for the Windwards since the 2007–08 season, and was aged 21 at the time of his most recent appearance.

References

External links
Player profile and statistics at CricketArchive
Player profile and statistics at ESPNcricinfo

1987 births
Living people
Grenadian cricketers
Windward Islands cricketers
People from Saint Andrew Parish, Grenada